The Hong Kong Special Administrative Region Basic Law Consultative Committee (BLCC; 香港基本法諮詢委員會) was an official body established in 1985 to canvass views in Hong Kong on the drafts of the Hong Kong Basic Law.

Background
The formation of the Consultative Committee was decided at the first meeting of the Hong Kong Basic Law Drafting Committee (BLDC), for consultation with the Hong Kong people on various drafts of the Hong Kong Basic Law. The membership of the BLCC was completely consisted of Hong Kong persons. 25 of the Hong Kong members of the Drafting Committee formed a Sponsors Committee to work on the formation of the BLCC. The five BLDC vice-chairmen residing in Hong Kong including Xu Jiatun were asked to take up the preparatory work for setting up the BLCC while the Xinhua News Agency provided the necessary assistance. Three of the tycoons on the BLDC provided necessary funds to cover costs.

The appointment of Consultative Committee was opposed by some influential members from the business sector in the Drafting Committee, as it introduced an unnecessary degree of democracy and public participation. In the end the BLDC members had considerable influence over the composition and work of the Consultative Committee since they drafted the constitution of the BLCC. After almost six months of preparations, the Consultative Committee was formally established on 18 December 1985. T. K. Ann, chief opponent of the Consultative Committee and vice-chairman of the BLDC was appointed the chair of the BLCC and other members were given key positions through procedures of dubious validity. Mao Junnian, the Secretary General of the BLCC, was subsequently replaced by Leung Chun-ying.

Composition
The Consultative Committee had 180 members. Some of members were nominated by designated organisations, but most of them were invited directly by the Drafting Committee members, who also vetoed over nominations of the organisations. The BLCC members also included the Senior Unofficial Members of the Legislative Council of Hong Kong, Lydia Dunn and of the Executive Council, Chung Sze-yuen, who were appointed by the British colonial government.  It also included a number of social activists who called for a faster pace of democratic reform, such as Lee Wing-tat and Frederick Fung. The Consultative Committee was criticised of favouring over the conservative business and professional interests, and nominating some key pro-Beijing figures. Lau Chin-shek of the Hong Kong Christian Industrial Committee was initially nominated by a labour joint conference to stand for selection by was turned down by Xu Jiatun on the ground that "quite a few businessmen in Hong Kong resented him."

The Consultative Committee formed eight sub-groups, namely the structure of the Basic Law; the political structure; law; residents' rights and duties; finance, business, and economy; culture, science and technology, education and religion; external affairs; and the relationship between Central Authorities and the Special Administrative Region. Although it was planned to seek the views of Hong Kong residents, groups, ministries and individuals in China, but no formal machinery was established for this purpose.

The effectiveness of the BLCC was doubted as the public opinion was pushed through the BLCC which the Consultative Committee would merely report the diversity of the views to the Drafting Committee, but not indicate the degree of public support of the public views.

Election
At the first meeting of the Consultative Committee during the election of the executive committee of the BLCC, a BLDC member, Y. K. Pao showed up to chair the meeting although he was not a BLCC member. He ignored procedures and proceeded to read out a list of 19 names saying who would be the chairman and who would be secretary is so on, and then he directed the gathered members to elect them with a round of applause. This kind of arrangement was commonplace on the Mainland but not in Hong Kong and it led to complaints. Although another meeting was called to rectify the violation of procedures, the same nineteen members were chosen and seven officers were also "elected".

Factions
The dominating group within the Consultative Committee was the Business and Professional Group of the Basic Law Consultative Committee, as known as the Group of 89, led by tycoon Vincent Lo. It was formed in April 1985 by 57 BLCC members and later added two more members.

Subsequently, the liberal community representatives, social workers and professionals BLCC members formed the Group of 190. However it was a small group compared to the Group of 89 without resources that the business elites commanded.

To avoid future divisions, the Chinese government created the positions of Hong Kong Affairs Adviser and District Affairs Adviser in 1992. The highly honorific titles helped to prevent disputes in Beijing's 'united front'.

Consultation process
The BLCC held two rounds of consultation on drafting the Basic Law. The first was from May to September in 1986, the second from February to October in 1989. During the first consultation period, the BLCC received 73,000 submissions for the electoral issues of the legislature after 1997. There were also many public meetings being held and discussions in the media. The response in the second period was smaller as it was taken over by the Tiananmen Square event.

After the Tiananmen massacre on 4 June 1989, the Consultative Committee suspended its work for a few weeks. The BLCC ceased to exist of the Basic Law was adopted by the National People's Congress on 4 April 1990 and promulgated the same day by the President of the People's Republic of China, Yang Shangkun.

Membership
List of members of the Basic Law Consultative Committee: (the list is in Chinese character order consistent with the official document)
 Van Lau
 Man Sai-cheong
 Man Hon-ming
 Mo Kwan-nin
 Wilfred Wong Ying-wai
 Ronnie Wong Man-chiu
 Wong Kwan-cheng
 Shek Wai
 Seto Fai
 James Tien Pei-chun
 Annie Wu Suk-ching
 Ann Tse-kai
 Lawrence C.H. Chu
 Aloysius Chu Fee-loong
 Kong Tak-yan
 Ho Man-fat
 Ho Ting-kwan
 Edward Ho Sing-tin
 Raymond Ho Chung-tai
 Stanley Ho
 Ewan Yee Lup-yuen
 Lee Jung-kong
 Harold T. Wu
 Steve Ng Siu-pang
 Peter Woo Kwong-ching
 Ng Tor-tai
 Ng Hong-mun
 Agnes Ng Mung-chan
 Ng Kam-tsuen
 Ng Yiu-tung
 Shum Choi-sang
 Nick Griffin
 Lee Wing-tat
 Peter Lee Chung-yin
 Paul Lee Kai-yu
 Lee Kai-ming
 Lee Lin-sang
 Arthur Li Kwok-cheung
 Richard Li King-hang
 Li Siu-kei
 Ronald Li Fook-shiu
 Elsie Tu
 A. de O. Sales
 Shung Jih-chong
 Shen Peng-ying
 Michael Naele Somerville
 Philip Yuen Pak-yiu
 Nelson Chow Wing-sun
 Lam Kwong-yu
 John Stove Lambourn
 Shao You-bao
 Eddy Yau Shik-fan
 Christina Yu Wai-mui
 Veronica W. Cha
 Louis Cha
 Hu Fa-kuang
 Hu Chu-jen
 Tang Hsiang-chien
 Wut Chiu
 Tsui Sze-man
 Zee Sze-yong
 Zee Kwoh-kung
 William H.C. Tsui
 Samson Sun
 Sun Sheng-tsang
 Anthony Ha Man-ho
 Louis E. Keloon Ha
 Hari N. Harilela
 Joseph Ma Ching-chung
 Ko Siu-wah
 Ko Gar-yee
 William Ko Chan-gock
 Cheung Sai-lam
 Tommy Cheung Yu-yan
 Cheung Yau-kai
 Cheung Pak-chi
 Chang Ka-mun
 Cheung Chun-kwok
 Denis Chang Khen-lee
 Chang Wan-fung
 Stephen Cheong Kam-chuen
 Andrew Chuang Siu-leung
 Kwok Yuen-hon
 Kwok Man-cho
 Philip Kwok Chi-kuen
 Tso Wung-wai
 Leung Siu-tong
 Leung Lam-hoi
 Leung Chun-ying
 Leong Che-hung
 Cheung Lun
 Kasim Wilson Tuet Wai-sin
 Anthony Luk Tung-chin
 John Lok Hsiao-pei
 Chan Pun
 Peter Chan Chi-kwan
 Chan Siu-kam
 Chan Wing-kee
 Chan Hip-ping
 Edward Chen
 Chan Ying-lun
 Thomas Chen Tseng-tao 
 Chan Cheng-chun
 Edwin Tao Hsueh-chi
 Mak Chan
 Mak Hoi-wah
 I.R.A. MacCallum
 Michael Miles
 To Shui-moon
 Tsang Kwong-to
 Tsang Hin-chi
 Jeffrey Y.S. Tsang
 Wan Kwok-shing
 Cheng Kai-nam
 Ching Yune-kai
 Shu Tse-wong
 David Edward Leslie Wong Yat-huen
 Wong Wan-tin
 Wong Kong-hon
 Wong Hong-yuen
 Philip Wong Yu-hong
 Wong Po-yan
 Raymond Huang
 Wong Lai-chuen
 Rayson Lisung Huang
 Fung Ho-keung
 Tony Fung Wing-cheung
 William Fung Kwok-lun
 Fung Wai-kwong
 Daniel R. Fung
 Frederick Fung Kin-kee
 Yeung Yue-man
 Howard Young
 T.L. Yang
 Henrietta Ip Man-hing
 Ip Yeuk-lam
 Luke Yip Jing-ping
 Tung Chee-hwa
 Raymond Wu Wai-yung
 Kenneth Chow Charn-ki
 Peter J. Wrangham
 Lawrence Kadoorie
 Liu Ching-leung
 Liu Lit-man
 Lincoln Yung Chu-kuen
 William Mong Man-wai
 Liu Yong-ling
 Lau Nai-keung
 Eric Au Sing-wai
 Poon Chung-kwong
 Poon Chun-leung
 Pun Kwok-shing
 Pun Chiu-yin
 Choy Tak-ho
 Tam Ling-kwan
 Mignonne Cheng
 Cheng Yu-tung
 Cheng Chung-wai
 Cheng Yiu-tong
 Tang Hing-yee
 Lo King-man
 Tsin Sai-nin
 Fok Wah-pun
 Timothy Fok Tsun-ting
 Daniel Tse Chi-wai
 Char Nee-quin
 Jacob Tse Wai-chee
 Chung King-fai
 Chung Chi-yung
 Brian H. Tisdall
 Patrick Charles Samuel Deveson
 David Wylie Gairns
 Kan Fook-yee
 Peter Kwong Kong-kit
 Vincent Lo Hong-sui
 Anthony Gordon Rogers
 Lo Tak-shing
 Helmut Sohmen
 Ku Sze-chung
 Kung Chi-keung

See also
 Hong Kong Basic Law Drafting Committee

References

Bibliography

 
 

 

Politics of Hong Kong
History of Hong Kong
1985 establishments in Hong Kong
1990 disestablishments in Hong Kong
Hong Kong Basic Law